Manufacture d'armes de Bayonne (sometimes also called Manufacture d’Armes Automatiques de Bayonne) was a French pistol manufacturer. The company was founded by Léon Barthe in 1920. It survived the German occupation during World War II, and after several changes in ownership wound up being a subsidiary of Fabrique Nationale of Herstal sometime in the 1970s.

MAB made parts for FN under their ownership, but eventually was forced to close in September 1982.

See also
 MAB Model A
 MAB Model D pistol
 MAB PA-15 pistol

References

External links
 A Brief History of MAB by Ed Buffaloe

Firearm manufacturers of France
Manufacturing companies established in 1920
Manufacturing companies disestablished in 1982
FN Herstal firearms
Companies based in Nouvelle-Aquitaine
Bayonne